Speight is both a surname and a given name. Notable people with the name include:

People with the surname
 Bobby Speight (1930–2007), American college basketball player
 E. E. Speight (1871–1949), English academic in Japan and India, author, publisher
 George Speight (born 1957), also known as Ilikimi Naitini, Fijian politician and principal instigator of the 2000 coup
 Henry Speight (born 1988), Australian rugby player
 Jake Speight (born 1985), English footballer
 Jesse Speight (1795–1847), American politician
 Johnny Speight (1920–1998), English television writer
 Lester Speight (born before 1965), American football player, wrestler and actor
 Mark Speight (1965–2008), British television presenter
 Mark Speight (born 1970), British organist
 Martin Speight (born 1967), English cricketer
 Mick Speight (born 1951), English footballer
 Peter Speight (born 1992), British skier
 Randolph L. Speight (1919–1999), American jurist
 Richard Speight (1838–1901), Australian railway commissioner
 Richard Speight, Jr. (born 1970), American actor
 Sadie Speight (1906–1992), British architect, designer and writer
 Wally Speight, English footballer
 Wilton Speight (born 1994), American college football player

People with the given name
Speight Jenkins (born 1937), American opera manager

See also 
 Speight's, a New Zealand brewery and their brand of beer